John Salvado (born 11 November 1939) is an Australian former cricketer. He played four first-class cricket matches for Victoria in 1964.

Salvado from the district club Hawthorn East Melbourne was called up on four occasions during the summer season of 1963-1964 to play for Victoria. He was a right arm fast medium pacer who could open the bowling. In his four Sheffield Shield matches he took 7 wickets at an average of 46.57.

Salvado also played Australian rules football. He was the leading goalkicker at Box Hill from 1959 to 1963. He later kicked more than 100 goals in a season on three occasions while playing for East Malvern in the Federal Football League during the late 1960s. He led the leagues list with 105 in 1966, 105 in 1968, 102 in 1966 and 95 in 1971.

See also
 List of Victoria first-class cricketers

References

External links
 

1939 births
Living people
Australian cricketers
Victoria cricketers
Cricketers from Melbourne
Box Hill Football Club players